Hamilton Hyde Kellogg (September 6, 1899 - July 5, 1977) was the fifth bishop of Minnesota in The Episcopal Church.

Early life and education
Kellogg was born on September 6, 1899 in Skaneateles, New York, the son of Walter Hamilton Kellogg & Jennie Louise Kellogg. He was educated at the High School in Skaneateles and then at the Lawrenceville School, graduating in 1917. He then studied at Williams College, from where he graduated with a Bachelor of Arts in 1921, and was awarded a Doctor of Divinity in 1944. He also earned a Master of Arts from Columbia University in 1924. He also attended the General Theological Seminary, graduating with a Bachelor of Divinity in 1924, and earning a Doctor of Sacred Theology in 1946. The University of the South also awarded him a Doctor of Divinity in 1946, while he was awarded another by Seabury-Western Theological Seminary in 1957. Syracuse University awarded him with a Doctor of Laws in 1956.

Ordained Ministry
Kellogg was ordained deacon in April 1924 by Bishop Charles Fiske, and priest in December 1924 by Bishop Edward H. Coley. He married Mildred Sarah Haley on June 10, 1929. He served as priest-in-charge of St Alban's Church in Syracuse, New York between 1924 and 1925, and then assistant priest at Christ Church in Greenwich, Connecticut between 1925 and 1929. In 1929, he became rector of St James' Church in Danbury, Connecticut, where he served till 1941. In 1941, he became an Army chaplain, and he traveled extensively, and during World War II ministered to troops during the Battle of the Bulge and the crossing of the Rhine. After the end of the war, he became rector of Christ Church in Houston, Texas, and then became its first Dean once Christ Church became the diocesan cathedral.

Bishop
Kellogg was elected Coadjutor Bishop of Minnesota on February 21, 1952, during a special diocesan convention. He was consecrated as bishop coadjutor in St. Mark's Cathedral in Minneapolis on June 24, 1952. He then was installed as diocesan bishop on December 4, 1956, and retained the post until his retirement on December 31, 1970.

See also

 List of Succession of Bishops for the Episcopal Church, USA

References and external links 

The Episcopal Diocese of Minnesota

Episcopal bishops of Minnesota
1977 deaths
1899 births
World War II chaplains
General Theological Seminary alumni
Williams College alumni
People from Skaneateles, New York